Death Shall Rise is the second album by British death metal band Cancer. It was released on 24 May 1991 through Vinyl Solution.

Track listing 
All tracks by Cancer

Personnel 
Cancer
 James Murphy - Lead Guitar
 Carl Stokes - Drums
 John Walker - Vocals, Guitar
 Ian Buchanan - Bass

Guest musician
 Glen Benton - Backing Vocals on "Hung, Drawn and Quartered"

Production
 John 'The Don' Dent - Mastering
 Tim Hubbard - Photography
 Junior Tomlin - Cover art
 Scott Burns - Producer
 Mike Marsh - Mastering

References

1991 albums
Cancer (band) albums
Albums produced by Scott Burns (record producer)
Albums recorded at Morrisound Recording